Medea is a 1730 play by the British writer Charles Johnson. It is about Medea from Greek mythology and based on the play Medea by Euripides.

The original Drury Lane cast included  Mary Porter as Medea, Robert Wilks as Jason, William Mills as Aegeus, Christiana Horton as Ethra, John Mills as Creon, Sarah Thurmond as Creusa, Thomas Hallam as Eumelus and John Corey as Therapion.

References

Bibliography
 Burling, William J. A Checklist of New Plays and Entertainments on the London Stage, 1700-1737. Fairleigh Dickinson Univ Press, 1992.
 

1730 plays
West End plays
Tragedy plays
Plays by Charles Johnson
Plays based on Medea (Euripides play)